John C. Mackey was an American football coach. He served as the head football coach at Detroit College—now known as the University of Detroit Mercy—for two seasons, from 1900 to 1901, compiling a record of 6–5.

Head coaching record

References

Year of birth missing
Year of death missing
Detroit Titans football coaches